Lucian Ilie (born 14 October 1967) is a retired Romanian footballer who played for Rapid Bucharest, in Sweden for Jönköpings Södra, and Belgian side K.V. Mechelen, in the Netherlands for FC Wageningen, FC Groningen, BV Veendam, FC Zwolle and DVS '33. In 1989, while playing for Rapid Bucharest, after a match in Sweden against IFK Göteborg, Lucian Ilie alongside teammates Gabriel Ciolponea and Alexandru Aprodu fled from the hotel and asked for political asylum in Sweden, they were three of the few Romanian players who fled the country to escape the communist regime.

References

External links

1967 births
Living people
Romanian footballers
FC Rapid București players
K.V. Mechelen players
FC Wageningen players
PEC Zwolle players
FC Groningen players
SC Veendam players
Expatriate footballers in Sweden
Expatriate footballers in Belgium
Expatriate footballers in the Netherlands
Romanian expatriate sportspeople in Sweden
Romanian expatriate sportspeople in the Netherlands
Romanian expatriate sportspeople in Belgium
Romanian expatriate footballers
People from Dâmbovița County
Jönköpings Södra IF players
Liga I players
Eredivisie players
Eerste Divisie players
Association football midfielders
Romanian defectors
DVS '33 players